Wonderland is an American medical drama television series directed by Peter Berg that aired on ABC. It depicted daily life in a mental institution from the perspectives of both the doctors and patients. Only two episodes aired on ABC during its original run, from March 30 to April 6, 2000. DirecTV aired all eight filmed episodes on its channel The 101 Network starting January 14, 2009. In 2014, the entire series was available for free on Hulu (which has since become a subscription service).

The show had controversial positions on the mental health crisis and its treatment.

Main cast
Ted Levine – Dr. Robert Banger (8 episodes, 2000)
Michelle Forbes – Dr. Lyla Garrity (8 episodes, 2000)
Michael Jai White – Dr. Derrick Hatcher (7 episodes, 2000)
Billy Burke – Dr. Abe Matthews (8 episodes, 2000)
Martin Donovan – Dr. Neil Harrison (8 episodes, 2000)
Joelle Carter – Dr. Heather Miles (6 episodes, 2000)
Patricia Clarkson ... Tammy Banger (8 episodes, 2000)

Main crew
Peter Berg – creator, executive producer (writer/director 1 episode, 2000 "Pilot")
Tony Krantz – executive producer (8 episodes, 2000)
James Steven Sadwith – consulting producer (7 episodes, 2000)
Brian Grazer – executive producer (unknown episodes)
Peter R. McIntosh – producer (unknown episodes)
Barry M. Schkolnick
John David Coles (unknown episodes)
Charles McDougall (unknown episodes)
Oz Scott

Episodes

Ratings
Episode 1: 13 million viewers
Episode 2: 7.5 million viewers

Incidental music 
The theme song of the show is a simple humming. It is performed by Madonna, although the DirecTV re-airing of the show uses a different theme song (not by Madonna).

References

External links

2000 American television series debuts
2000 American television series endings
2000s American drama television series
American Broadcasting Company original programming
2000s American medical television series
English-language television shows
Television series by ABC Studios
Television series created by Peter Berg
Television shows set in New York City
Audience (TV network) original programming
Television series by Imagine Entertainment